Qadir Yar (1802–1892), born Qadar Baksh,  was a Muslim Sandhu Jat and a poet of the Punjabi language. Born in Gujranwala, he wrote Punjabi Qissa like Qissa Purana Bhagat, Raja Rasal.

Life
Qadir Yar was born in the village Machhike, in Gujranwala District in Punjab (now in Pakistan) during the rule of the Sikh Empire. He belonged to an agriculturalist family and was Sandhu by caste. The details of his life are not available, except that he received his education at the village mosque. 

He was the court poet of the Lahore Sikh Darbar, during the reign of Maharaja Ranjit Singh.

Works
Qadir Yar started his literary career with Mehraj Nama (1832), the longest poem composed by him and containing 1014 couplets. The poem gives a fictional account of Prophet Muhammad's journey through the seven skies. It tells the story of Puran Bhagat. His other significant works include Qissa Sohni Mahinwal, Hari Singh Nalwa Di Var, and Var Rani Kokilan.

Further reading

References 

 M.Athar Tahir (1988). Qadir Yar: A Critical Introduction. Punjab Adabi Board Lahore Pakistan. P. 141.

1802 births
1892 deaths
19th-century poets
Punjabi people